RMS Empress of Canada was an ocean liner built in 1920 for the Canadian Pacific Steamships (CP) by Fairfield Shipbuilding & Engineering Company at Govan on the Clyde in Scotland. This ship—the first of three CP vessels to be named Empress of Canada—regularly traversed the trans-Pacific route between the west coast of Canada and the Asian waters until 1939.

History
In 1920, Canadian Pacific Steamships ordered a new ship to be built by Fairfield Shipbuilding & Engineering Company at Govan near Glasgow in Scotland. The ship was launched on 18 August 1920 with a notable speech by the general manager of the Canadian Pacific Ocean Services, Ltd., Sir Thomas Fisher, who noted the approximately $6,800,000 price compared to a pre-war cost of about $2,200,000 and cost of operation that had risen at least 350 per cent, which had forced first class fares from $76 to $202 (based on a $4 to the pound sterling) and predicted dire consequences for shipping and the British Empire. A world tour, planned for early 1921, was cancelled due to labour disturbances making on-schedule completion doubtful.

The liner undertook her maiden voyage on 5 May 1922.  Based at the port of Vancouver, British Columbia, Canada, the first Empress of Canada was intended to provide service to the Empire of Japan, Hong Kong, and China.  She was at the time the largest vessel ever engaged in trans-Pacific service. Her sister ships included Empress of France and Empress of Britain.

Great Kantō earthquake
On 4 September 1923, Empress of Canada arrived at Tokyo harbour—just three days after the devastating Great Kantō earthquake struck the city.  Those aboard Empress of Canada found that the Canadian ocean liner  had been converted to a command post from which the British consul was directing relief work. Empress of Canada transported refugees – 587 Europeans, 31 Japanese, and 362 Chinese – to Kobe, Japan.

On 13 October 1929, Empress of Canada ran aground off Vancouver Island, British Columbia. Ninety-six passengers were taken off by tender and landed at Victoria, British Columbia. She was refloated on 15 October and towed to Esquimalt, British Columbia, for drydocking.

World War II
Following the outbreak of World War II in 1939, she was converted for use as a troopship. She was one of the ships in the first Australian/New Zealand convoy, designated US.1 for secrecy, destined for North Africa and at that time not yet fully converted for full troop capacity with few ships of the convoy carrying more than 25 per cent more than their normal passenger load. Empress of Canada departed Wellington, New Zealand on 6 January 1940 with the New Zealand elements, joined the Australian ships and arrived in Aden on 8 February from where the convoy split with all ships heading for Suez.

On 14 June 1940 the ship was part of the troop convoy US.3 consisting of the liners Andes, Aquitania, Empress of Britain, Mauretania and Queen Mary, which sailed from Australia en route to the Clyde and was met to the west of Gibraltar by a naval force led by the battlecruiser .

She continued to transport ANZAC troops from New Zealand and from Australia to the war zones in Europe until sunk. The return voyage from Europe was not less dangerous than the trip north had been. Of the approximate 1,800 people on board, 392 died. 149 of the fatalities reported were Italian prisoners. British rescuers saved 800 of those aboard. Leonardo da Vinci herself was sunk by British patrol ships two months later, with no survivors.

See also
 List of ocean liners

Notes

Citations

External links

 The Role of the CP Ships in World War II
 New York Public Library Digital Gallery:
 NYPL ID 97714, unknown photographer:  Empress, starboard view
 NYPL ID 97713, unknown photographer:  Empress, portside view
 IWM Interview with survivor William Birch
 IWM Interview with survivor Mike Juni

1920 ships
Ships built in Govan
Ships of CP Ships
Ocean liners
Maritime incidents in 1929
Maritime incidents in March 1943
Ships sunk by Italian submarines
Steamships of Canada
Troopships of Canada
Shipwrecks of Africa